Yao Tongbin (September 3, 1922 – June 8, 1968) was a Chinese scientist and one of China's foremost missile engineers. He was beaten to death during the Cultural Revolution in 1968. In 1999, he was posthumously awarded the Two Bombs, One Satellite Meritorious Award, and officially recognized as a "martyr" within China.

Early life and education 
Yao was born in Wuxi, Jiangsu Province. He graduated from the department of metallurgy of National Tangshan Engineering College, now Southwest Jiaotong University in July 1945, and obtained a doctorate of foundry engineering from University of Birmingham in UK in 1951. In June 1953, Yao earned a Diploma in Metallurgy from the Royal School of Mines, Imperial College London. At the invitation of Eugen Piwowarsky from the RWTH Aachen University, he moved to West Germany in early 1954 and worked at Aachen as a research assistant at what was then the Institute for Ferrous Metallurgy.

Career 
After his return from Germany in 1957, Yao worked in China first as a research associate at the 5th Research Institute of the Chinese Ministry of Defense, later as Director of the Research Institute for Material and Process Technology. 

After returning to China in September 1957, Yao served in the Fifth Academy of the Ministry of National Defense, headed by Qian Xuesen. He helped found the Institute of Materials and Technology (later affiliated to the Seventh Ministry of Machine Building and became the director.

Murder 
After the eruption of the Cultural Revolution, the young engineer Ye Zhengguang overthrew the Seventh Ministry leadership and removed Minister Wang Bingzhang and Vice Minister Qian Xuesen. 

Within the Seventh Ministry, two mass factions, labeled as "915" and "916" respectively, appeared in September 1966. Whereas Faction 915 comprised mainly administrative office staff members and blue collar workers, Faction 916 primarily consisted of scientists, engineers, and technicians. The differences in opinion between the two factions soon escalated into warfare, spreading from the Third Academy to the First Academy and then throughout the entire Seventh Ministry. On June 8, 1968, Yao Tongbin was beaten to death at his own home by members of Faction 915.

Legacy 
After this loss of one of China's foremost missile engineers, Zhou Enlai ordered  for key technical experts.

After the end of the Cultural Revolution, the two perpetrators were sentenced in 1979 to 15 years and 12 years in prison for the murder of Yao. 

Because of his significant contribution to China's astronautical materials and technology, Yao was posthumously awarded the Two Bombs, One Satellite Meritorious Award in 1999 by Chinese government, over three decades after his murder.

References 

1922 births
1968 deaths
Deaths by beating
Scientists from Wuxi
People persecuted to death during the Cultural Revolution
Southwest Jiaotong University alumni
Alumni of the University of Birmingham
Chinese aerospace engineers